Admiral Sir Arthur Farquhar  (9 January 1815 – 29 January 1908) was a British Royal Navy officer who went on to be Commander-in-Chief, Plymouth.

Naval career
Farquhar joined the Royal Navy in 1829. He took part in the bombardment of Acre during the Oriental Crisis in 1840.

Promoted to Commander in 1844, Farquhar was given command of HMS Albatross in 1846 and fought pirates in Borneo in 1849. Promoted to Captain in 1849, he commanded HMS Malacca, HMS Victory, HMS Hannibal, HMS Hogue and HMS Lion.

Farquhar was appointed Commander-in-Chief, Pacific Station in 1869 and Commander-in-Chief, Plymouth in 1878. He retired in 1880.

There is a memorial to Farquhar in Christ Church, Kincardine O'Neil.

Family
In 1851 Farquhar married Ellen Rickman; the couple had nine sons and four daughters. He was an investor in the coal mines of Robert Dunsmuir.

See also

References

|-

1815 births
1908 deaths
Knights Commander of the Order of the Bath
Royal Navy admirals